North Carolina's 28th House district is one of 120 districts in the North Carolina House of Representatives. It has been represented by Republican Larry Strickland since 2017.

Geography
Since 2023, the district has included part of Johnston County. The district overlaps with the 10th Senate district.

District officeholders since 1993

Election results

2022

2020

2018

2016

2014

2012

2010

2008

2006

2004

2002

2000

References

North Carolina House districts
Johnston County, North Carolina